Jorge Carrascosa (born 15 August 1948 in Valentín Alsina), also known as El Lobo, is an Argentine former footballer who played as a left back. He played club football for Banfield, Rosario Central and Huracán and represented the Argentina national football team.

Career
Carrascosa started his career in 1967 with Banfield. He made his debut for Argentina in 1970 and was signed by Rosario Central, where he was part of the squad that won the Nacional 1971. 

In 1973, he joined Huracán where he won a second Argentine championship in his first season, the Metropolitano was the clubs first championship since the professionalisation of Argentine football in 1931.

Carrascosa was a member of the 1974 World Cup squad, but the Argentine team fared poorly, finishing bottom of their 2nd round group.

Carrascosa played for Argentina until 1977, making 30 appearances and scoring one goal. He resigned from the national team, while he was its captain, for personal reasons. He later declared that he was worn out from the media pressure and obsession for success typical of the football world.  He played for Huracán until his retirement in 1979.

Honours
 Rosario Central
Primera División Argentina: Nacional 1971

 Huracán
Primera División Argentina: Metropolitano 1973

References

External links
 
 HistoriasDeFútbol. Episodio 5 "Jorge Lobo Carrascosa, el gran capitán"

1948 births
Living people
Footballers from Buenos Aires
Argentine footballers
Association football defenders
Argentina international footballers
1974 FIFA World Cup players
Club Atlético Banfield footballers
Rosario Central footballers
Club Atlético Huracán footballers
Argentine Primera División players